Kadmon may refer to:
 Adam Kadmon, in Kabbalah
 Kadmon Corporation
 Kadmon, an Austrian musician, see Allerseelen (band)

See also
 Kadmonites
 Cadmus, also spelled Kadmos